Jaffna Hindu Ladies' College (abbreviated as JHLC) is a provincial school in Jaffna, Sri Lanka.

History

In 1935 the Jaffna Hindu College started admitting girls. On 10 September 1943 the Board of Management of Jaffna Hindu College and Affiliated Schools established a separate girls school - Jaffna Hindu Ladies College. This was the first girls "Hindu" school. JHLC was initially located at "Ponnalayam", the home of Sivagurunathar Ponnusamy. JHLC's growth necessitated larger premises and on 27 February 1944 JHLC moved to buildings at Jaffna Hindu College's playgrounds.

In 1941 Visaladchy Ammal Sivagurunathar, the founder of JHLC, donated land at "Naduththoddam", Arasady Road to the college. The founders husband Ramalingam Sivagurunathar and his niece Mrs. Valliammal Sivaguru also donated land to JHLC, including the Rajavarothaya Pillaiyar Temple. On 7 September 1945 JHLC moved to the Arasady Road site. In 1978 a new school, Jaffna Hindu Ladies' Primary School, catering for grades 1 to 5 was established next to JHLC.

See also
 List of schools in Northern Province, Sri Lanka

References

External links
 Jaffna Hindu Ladies' College

Educational institutions established in 1943
Girls' schools in Sri Lanka
Provincial schools in Sri Lanka
Schools in Jaffna
1943 establishments in Ceylon